The Daegu Civic Stadium was a stadium in Daegu sports complex in Daegu, South Korea. The former main stadium was used mostly for football matches of Daegu FC. During the 1986 Asian Games and 1988 Summer Olympics, it hosted some football matches. The stadium had a capacity of 30,000 (19,467 seats) and opened on 20 April 1948. The stadium was expanded and reconstructed in 1975, and was renovated and repaired on 8 September 2003. The main stadium of the complex was demolished in 2017, and the new DGB Daegu Bank Park was built at the same place.

The complex is called “Daegu Complex Sports Town”. It now has DGB Daegu Bank Park, indor gym, small soccer field, and Daegu Baseball Stadium, which was a formal home of Samsung Lions.

External links
 World Stadiums

Venues of the 1988 Summer Olympics
Olympic football venues
Football venues in South Korea
Multi-purpose stadiums in South Korea
Sports venues in Daegu
Daegu FC
Pohang Steelers
Sports venues completed in 1948
1948 establishments in South Korea
Venues of the 1986 Asian Games
K League 1 stadiums
Sports venues demolished in 2017
Demolished buildings and structures in South Korea
20th-century architecture in South Korea